The Sun Comes Up is a 1949 Metro-Goldwyn-Mayer Technicolor picture with Lassie. Jeanette MacDonald had been off the screen for five years until her return in Three Daring Daughters (1948), but The Sun Comes Up was to be her last. In it, she had to share the screen not with an up-and-coming younger actress but with a very popular animal star. Although her retreat from a film career can be blamed largely on an increasingly debilitating heart ailment (which eventually took her life at the age of 61 in 1965), MacDonald continued to make concert and TV appearances after this. Her last radio performance was a broadcast version of this same story on Screen Guild Theater in March 1950.

Plot
Ex-opera singer Helen Lorfield Winter (Jeanette MacDonald) rents a house in the small town of Brushy Gap, in the hills not too far from the Smokies, Blue Ridge, and Atlanta Georgia with her dog, Lassie, after the tragic death of her son. There she befriends Jerry, a young orphan (Claude Jarman Jr.). Growing attached to Jerry, but not wanting children so soon after the death of her own son, Helen leaves Brushy Gap to resume her singing career. While she is away, Jerry is caught in heavy rain returning Lassie home and develops pneumonia. Helen returns to Brushy Gap to find the owner of the house, Thomas Chandler (Lloyd Nolan), nursing Jerry back to health. Soon after Jerry has recovered, the orphanage catches on fire, and Lassie and Tom both rescue Jerry from the blaze. Helen then decides to adopt Jerry and remain in Brushy Gap.

Main cast
 Pal (credited as "Lassie") as Lassie
 Jeanette MacDonald as Helen Lorfield Winter 
 Lloyd Nolan as Thomas I. Chandler 
 Claude Jarman Jr. as Jerry 
 Lewis Stone as Arthur Norton 
 Percy Kilbride as Mr. Willie B. Williegood 
 Nicholas Joy as Victor Alvord 
 Margaret Hamilton as Mrs. Golightly 
 Hope Landin as Mrs. Pope 
 Esther Somers as Susan, the maid

Production
Parts of The Sun Comes Up were filmed in Glenwood, California, and lumber from the set was used to build the last town post office.

Music
In 2010, Film Score Monthly released the complete scores of the seven Lassie feature films released by MGM between 1943 and 1955 as well as Elmer Bernstein’s score for It's a Dog's Life (1955) in the CD collection Lassie Come Home: The Canine Cinema Collection, limited to 1000 copies.  
Due to the era when these scores were recorded, nearly half of the music masters have been lost so the scores had to be reconstructed and restored from the best available sources, mainly the Music and Effects tracks as well as monaural ¼″ tapes.

The score for The Sun Comes Up was composed by André Previn.

Track listing for The Sun Comes Up (Disc 4)

Main Title*/New Trick for Lassie*/Hank’s Death* - 2:53 
Helen Leaves Her Home*/Sleep in the Car*/Scenery*/Rabbits for Rent*/That’s a Bargain* - 4:27 
I Had a Boy*/Jerry’s Wages* - 2:03 
Adoption* 0:44 
Long Walk*/Tears for Two*/Lassie Herds the Cows* - 4:28 
Storm Over Jerry*/Helen Meets Tom*/I’m Going to Manville*/Pneumonia* - 4:23 
I Always Eat It*/I Can’t Take Jerry Away*/Fare You Well* - 4:49 
Tom & Jerry* - 3:35 
Jerry Runs Away*/One Dog’s Family & End Title*/End Cast - 2:06

Bonus tracks

Tes Yeux (René Rabey) 0:51 
Un Bel Di (Giacomo Puccini) 3:33 
Songs My Mother Taught Me (Antonín Dvořák) 1:09 
Cousin Ebeneezer (Previn–William Katz) 1:13 
If You Were Mine (Previn–Katz) 1:46 
Tom & Jerry*† (film version) 3:33 
Jerry Runs Away*†/One Dog’s Family & End Title*†/End Cast (film version) - 2:06

Contains Sound Effects

†Contains Dialogue

Total Time: 43:71

Reception
According to MGM records the film earned $2,044,000 at the box office, resulting in a loss of $549,000.

Home media
On November 27, 2012, The Sun Comes Up was released on DVD through the Warner Archive.

References

External links

 
 
 
 
 
 

Metro-Goldwyn-Mayer films
1949 films
1949 drama films
American drama films
1940s English-language films
Lassie films
Films directed by Richard Thorpe
Films shot in California
Films scored by André Previn
Films with screenplays by William Ludwig
1940s American films